Ballynoran Church is a medieval church and National Monument in County Tipperary, Ireland.

Location

History

The church of Ard Colm, "height of the doves". Ardcolme appears in the Papal Taxations of 1306, and Ardcolum in the 1654 Down Survey.

Building
The church is rectangular and now roofless. There is no public path to the church buildings.

References

Religion in County Tipperary
Archaeological sites in County Tipperary
National Monuments in County Tipperary
Former churches in the Republic of Ireland